Villeneuve-sur-Allier is a commune in the Allier department in Auvergne-Rhône-Alpes in France.

Population

Sights
 Arboretum de Balaine

See also
Communes of the Allier department

References

Communes of Allier
Allier communes articles needing translation from French Wikipedia